Only Because It's You is a 2012 South Korean television series starring Yoon Hae-young, Yoon Ji-min, Lee Jae-hwang and Park Hyuk-kwon. It aired on SBS from September 3, 2012, to February 15, 2013, on Mondays to Fridays at 8:30 a.m. for 117 episodes.

Plot
The series follows three women who reunite for the first time after leaving high school eighteen years earlier. Now in their 30s, the women find themselves facing difficult challenges in their personal and romantic lives.

Cast
Yoon Hae-young as Kang Jin-joo
Heo Jung-eun as young Kang Jin-joo
Yoon Ji-min as Yang Soo-bin
Lee Jae-hwang as Seo Ji-hwan
Park Hyuk-kwon as Chun Myung-hwan
Ra Mi-ran as Yoon Gong-ja
Kwon Hyung-joon as Gi Se-nam
Song Ok-sook as Ma Joo-hee
Yu Ji-in as Go Ae-rang
Choi Da-in as Chun Eun-byul
Jeon Jin-seo as Seo Tae-yang
Ahn Suk-hwan as Jack Black
Lee Jong-nam as Na Jung-ja
Jo Hee-bong as Ma Do-yo
Kang Ki-hwa as Uhm Hye-ra
Geum Bo-ra as Gong-ja's mother in-law
Bae Sung-woo as Je-bi
Kim Seung-gi
Kang Seo-eun

References

External links

Seoul Broadcasting System television dramas
2012 South Korean television series debuts
2013 South Korean television series endings
Korean-language television shows
South Korean melodrama television series
South Korean romance television series